Alisa Ahmann is a German fashion model.

Career
Ahmann and her sisters (including twin Xenia) were discovered in Stuttgart, Germany. She debuted as a Calvin Klein Collection exclusive in 2014 and opened their F/W show. Within a year she did campaigns for Gucci and Alberta Ferretti, and walked for Hermès, Chloé, and Oscar de la Renta. She has also walked for Dior, Jil Sander, Donna Karan, Elie Saab, Stella McCartney, Valentino, Miu Miu, Alexander McQueen, and Giambattista Valli.

Ahmann has been on the cover of Elle Germany, Vogue Germany, and Vogue Italia among others. She has appeared in magazines such as W, Vogue Brasil, Self Service, Vogue Paris, and Allure.

Ahmann was once ranked as a "Top 50" model by Models.com.

References

German female models
Living people
Twin models
People from Stuttgart
1994 births
Elite Model Management models